The Yungas warbler (Basileuterus punctipectus) is a species of bird in the family Parulidae. It was previously considered conspecific with the three-striped warbler. This bird is found in South America from southeastern Peru to southcentral Bolivia.

References

 Gill F, D Donsker & P Rasmussen  (Eds). 2022. IOC World Bird List (v12.2). doi :  10.14344/IOC.ML.12.2.

Basileuterus
Birds described in 1924